WLEA (1480 AM) is a radio station broadcasting a talk radio format. Licensed to Hornell, New York, United States, the station serves the Canisteo Valley area, and is a part of the Elmira Corning Radio Market The station is currently owned by PMJ Communications, Inc. Pmj Communications was founded by Kevin Doran, who also hosted the station's morning show for a time in the 1970s, then again from the early 1990s until his death in 2015; his estate continues to own the company and sister station WCKR. Previously, the station was owned by Charlie Henderson, who represented Hornell in the State Assembly (1956-1981).

FM translator
An FM translator is used to widen the coverage area of WLEA, especially at night when the AM broadcasting frequency reduces power to only 19 watts.

History
WLEA signed on in 1948 at 1320 kHz; two years later, the 1320 slot was bought out by WWHG, later the now-defunct WHHO, necessitating the station to move to a new frequency. It was part of the Mutual Broadcasting System. Actor Bob Crane was one of the station's earliest employees, beginning as a janitor and later hosting "The 1480 Club."

Programming heard on WLEA includes This Morning: America's First News, The Rush Limbaugh Show, The Sean Hannity Show, Jim Bohannon, John Batchelor, a local interview show called "Newsmaker Show" and the "1480 Club", as well as local news updates, ABC News Radio and Fox News Radio.

WLEA is the broadcast home of the Hornell Dodgers team and also carries Hornell High School athletics (sister station WCKR carries Canisteo–Greenwood High School sports).

References

External links

LEA
News and talk radio stations in the United States
Hornell, New York